The Ngiemboon (N'Jhamboon) language, Ngyɛmbɔɔŋ, is one of a dozen Bamileke languages spoken in Cameroon. Its speakers are located primarily within the department of Bamboutos in the West Region of Cameroon.

Dialects are Batcham (Basham), Balatchi (Balaki) and Bamoungong (Bamongoun).

Alphabet

Phonology 
The consonants are:

The vowels are /a/, /ɔ/, /ε/, /e/, /i/, /o/, and /u/.

Ngiemboon is a tonal language, and uses the high tone /˦/, the low tone /˨/, the falling tone /˥˩/, and the rising tone /˩˥/.

References

External links
Database of audio recordings in Ngiemboon - basic Catholic prayers

Languages of Cameroon
Bamileke languages